Beaver Dam is a rural community on the Eastern Shore of Nova Scotia, Canada, in the Halifax Regional Municipality. Beaver Lake 17, a small Mi'kmaq reserve, is located in the community as well. The community is located adjacent to Lower Beaver Lake.

References

Communities in Halifax, Nova Scotia